Wesley Ernest Disney (October 31, 1883 – March 26, 1961) was an American politician and a U.S. Representative from Oklahoma. He was also a member of the Oklahoma House of Representatives.

Biography
Born in Richland, Kansas, Disney was the son of Wesley and Elizabeth Matney Disney, and attended the public schools of Kansas. He was graduated from the law department of the University of Kansas at Lawrence in 1906. He was admitted to the Kansas bar in 1906, the Oklahoma bar in 1908, and began practice in Muskogee, Oklahoma, in 1908. On September 22, 1910, he married Anna Van Sant, and they had two sons.

Career
Disney was county attorney of Muskogee County, Oklahoma, from 1911 to 1915. He served as member of the Oklahoma House of Representatives from 1919 to 1924. He was chairman of the board of managers in the impeachment trial of Governor Jack C. Walton in 1923.

Elected as a Democrat to the Seventy-second and to the six succeeding Congresses, Disney served from March 4, 1931 to January 3, 1945.  He was on the Banking and Currency Committee as well as the Ways and Means Committee, making him known as "watchdog of the Treasury". Not a candidate for renomination in 1944, he was an unsuccessful candidate for the Democratic nomination for United States Senator. He continued to practice law in Washington, D.C., and Tulsa, Oklahoma, and was also a successful lobbyist.

His brother, Richard L. Disney, was appointed as a judge of the United States Tax Court by Franklin D. Roosevelt.

Death
Disney died in Washington, D.C., on March 26, 1961 (age 77 years, 146 days). He is interred at Memorial Park Cemetery, Tulsa, Oklahoma.

References

External links

 Encyclopedia of Oklahoma History and Culture - Disney, Wesley
 Wesley E. Disney Collection and Photograph Collection at the Carl Albert Center
 

1883 births
1961 deaths
People from Shawnee County, Kansas
University of Kansas School of Law alumni
Politicians from Muskogee, Oklahoma
20th-century Members of the Oklahoma House of Representatives
Democratic Party members of the United States House of Representatives from Oklahoma
Democratic Party members of the Oklahoma House of Representatives
20th-century American politicians